A scrap metal shredder, also sometimes referred to as a metal scrap shredder, is a machine used for reducing the size of scrap metal. Scrap metal shredders come in many different variations and sizes.

Applications
Some examples of scrap metal materials that are commonly shredded are: 

Car crushers are large machines that turn a car into a large bucket of scrap steel and the rest of the car into non-ferrous materials, plastics and waste called automotive shredder residue. The glass, fabric, plastic, and all other non-ferrous materials are separated by eddy current magnets in place of heavy media separation. The non-ferrous materials may be referred to as "zorba". Often the profit from the non-ferrous materials covers the operating cost for the shredder.

When a metal shredder starts, the material enters into the tear box through the feeding system. The tear blade is loaded on the box. The material is torn into small pieces through the tear, extrusion and shear of the tear blade, and is discharged from the lower part of the box. 

Metal scrap recycling, also called secondary metal processing, is a large industry that processes, in the U.S. alone, 56 million tons of scrap iron and steel (including 10 million tons of scrap automobiles), 1.5 million tons of scrap copper, 2.5 million tons of scrap aluminum, 1.3 million tons of scrap lead, 300,000 tons of scrap zinc and 800,000 tons of scrap stainless steel, and smaller quantities of other metals, on a yearly basis.

Types
Scrap metal shredders can be equipped with different types of cutting systems: horizontal shaft, vertical shaft, single-shaft, two-shaft, three-shaft and four-shaft cutting systems. These shredder designs can be high speed, medium speed and sometimes slow-speed systems, they always include hammermills of a vertical and horizontal shaft design, and can also include in contrast to hammer mills slow speed technology which are also used to process or shred metal and plastic and other waste materials encountered in the scrap metal industry.
 
The largest scrap metal shredders in the world often have 10,000 horsepower (hp) and are made by a wide range of companies which all originated their designs from the 1966 patent applications of the Newell Group and the Williams Group as the first patented vertical and horizontal designs for auto shredding or scrap metal shredding. Often cited is the 9,200 hp shredder from the Lynxs group at the Sims plant at the mouth of the River Usk in Newport Wales with access by road, rail and sea. This Lynxs shredder can eat 450 cars per hour. However, the Lynxs shredders are not unique in this high hp range design. Historically the Schnitzer Steel group installed a 10,000 hp unit that they made on their own in 1980, and there are many Newell Shredders that have these high hp designs. A 9,000 horsepower Mega Shredder at Sims Metal Management's Claremont Terminal in Jersey City, New Jersey processes 4,000 tons of metal a day.

Environmental impact 
An engineered enclosure may be used to contain noise and dust. In 2018, the California Department of Toxic Substances Control requested public comment on plans to implement enforceable operating requirements for scrap metal shredders.

In Houston, the carcinogenic substance hexavalent chromium was identified as an emission from a scrap recycling facility.

See also 
 Crusher

References

External links 

 Map of Metal Shredding Locations in the United States, Recycling Today

Recycling
Waste management